"Sabbath Morning at Sea" is a poem  by Elizabeth Barrett Browning first published in 1839, which Sir Edward Elgar set to music in 1899 as the third song in his song-cycle Sea Pictures.

Poem

Elgar's setting 
The opening reintroduces the oceanic theme from Sea Slumber Song. Several lines in the last stanza are repeated. At "And on that sea commixed with fire" the opening bars of the song cycle are quoted.

References 

1839 poems
Songs by Edward Elgar
Poetry by Elizabeth Barrett Browning